Hyperanthes was a son of Darius the Great of Persia and brother to Xerxes I. He was present in the second invasion of Greece in 480 BC. According to Herodotus, he fought and died alongside his other brother Abrocomes in the battle of Thermopylae in the final phase known as the "Battle of Champions" (translation of Tom Holland), where the Spartans in their last stand fought feverishly against him and the Persian force over the retrieval of Leonidas' dead body.

References

Battle of Thermopylae
480 BC deaths
Family of Darius the Great
Persian people of the Greco-Persian Wars
Military leaders of the Achaemenid Empire
Year of birth unknown
5th-century BC Iranian people
Achaemenid princes